Raiders of the Lost Ark is a 1981 adventure film in the Indiana Jones franchise.

Raiders of the Lost Ark may also refer to:

Raiders of the Lost Ark (soundtrack), the soundtrack to the film
Raiders of the Lost Ark (video game), a 1982 video game based on the film
Raiders of the Lost Ark: The Adaptation, a 1989 fan film

See also
Indiana Jones (disambiguation)
Lost Ark (disambiguation)